Ai of Jin may refer to:

Marquis Ai of Jin (died 709 BC)
Duke Jing of Jin (Jiao) (died 434 BC), called Duke Ai of Jin in one chapter of Records of the Grand Historian
Emperor Ai of Jin (341–365)

See also
Emperor Aizong of Jin (1198–1234)